The 1910 Campeonato Carioca, the fifth edition of that championship, kicked off on May 1, 1910 and ended on October 30, 1910. It was organized by LMSA (Liga Metropolitana de Sports Athleticos, or Metropolitan Athletic Sports League). Six teams participated. Botafogo won the title for the 2nd time. Haddock Lobo was relegated.

Participating teams

System 
The tournament would be disputed in a double round-robin format, with the team with the most points winning the title. The team with the fewest points would be relegated.

Championship

References 

Campeonato Carioca seasons
Carioca